Silvia Celeste Rabimbi Cortesi (born December 15, 1997) is a Filipino model, actress and beauty pageant titleholder who was crowned Miss Universe Philippines 2022. She represented the Philippines at the Miss Universe 2022 competition, won by Miss USA R'Bonney Gabriel, a fellow  biracial Filipina. 

Cortesi was previously crowned Miss Earth Philippines 2018 and represented the Philippines at the Miss Earth 2018 pageant, where she finished in the Top 8.

Early life 
Silvia Celeste Rabimbi Cortesi was born on December 15, 1997 in Pasay, Metro Manila, Philippines, to a Filipino mother, Maria Luisa Rabimbi, and an Italian father who was born in Venezuela. Her mother was from Camarines Sur, Bicol and was also of distant Spanish and Chinese descent. Her parents met at an Italian restaurant in Manila which her father owned and her mother worked at. Cortesi grew up in a multicultural household, exposed to both her Filipino and Italian ancestries.

Cortesi was initially brought up in a neighborhood in Pasay, where her older sister Monica was raised. When she was six months old, her family moved to Parma, Italy, where she spent most of her upbringing. After her father died of a heart attack when she was ten years old, her mother raised both her and her sister as a single parent. As a teenager, Cortesi worked as a model and store cashier in Parma. She would also join several pageants in secret, which her mother discovered and allowed as long as she maintained good grades in school. 

Cortesi became interested in pursuing pageantry as a career and exploring her Filipino roots after being informed by her mother of Pia Wurtzbach's win representing the Philippines at Miss Universe 2015, and watching her performance during the event. Initially unsure of her career path at 18 years old, she was motivated by Wurtzbach's win to go into pageantry. She moved back to the Philippines in hopes of representing the country in Miss Universe despite only knowing her native Italian and not being fluent in English and Filipino; she eventually learned both languages her own. She stated that she faced discrimination in both Italy and the Philippines because of her heritage and upbringing.

Pageantry

Miss Philippines Earth-Italy 2018 
Cortesi is the inaugural winner of the Miss Philippines Earth-Italy pageant in Rome. She joined the pageant as she was encouraged by her mother.

Miss Earth Philippines 2018 

Cortesi represented the Filipino community of Rome, Italy at the Miss Earth Philippines 2018 pageant.

On May 19, 2018, she was crowned as Miss Earth Philippines 2018 by the outgoing titleholder Karen Ibasco.

Cortesi also won the following awards:

  Swimsuit Competition
  Long Gown Competition
  Resorts Wear Competition
  Cocktail Wear Competition
  Darling of the Press
 Miss Laus Group
 Hana Beauties finalist

Miss Earth 2018 

After winning the Miss Earth Philippines 2018 pageant, she gained the right to represent the Philippines at the Miss Earth 2018 pageant.

At the end of the competition, she finished as a Top 8 finalist. Nguyễn Phương Khánh of Vietnam won the said pageant.

Miss Universe Philippines 2022 

On April 6, 2022, representing Pasay, Cortesi was confirmed as one of the 32 official contestants for the Miss Universe Philippines 2022 competition.

During the competition, Cortesi won the following awards:
 Miss Photogenic
 Best in Swimsuit
 Frontrow Best Arrival Look – Netizens' Choice
 Miss Avana
 Miss Aqua Boracay
 Miss Sendwave

At the competition proper, she passed all rounds of competition including both the swimsuit and evening gown portions. At the final question and answer portion, she was asked: “If you could stop time for a day, how would you spend it?”, to which she responded:

At the end of the competition, Cortesi was crowned by outgoing Miss Universe Philippines 2021 Beatrice Gomez as Miss Universe Philippines 2022.

Miss Universe 2022 

Cortesi represented the Philippines at the 71st edition of the Miss Universe competition but was unplaced, officially ending the Philippines' twelve-year streak of consecutive placements in Miss Universe, from 2010 through 2021. R'Bonney Gabriel of the United States won the said pageant.

Personal life 
Cortesi is in a relationship with Filipino national football player Mathew Custodio, of professional football club United City. She has residences in Taguig and Pasay.

Cortesi is concurrently completing her degree in  real estate management (Bachelor of Science in Real Estate Management) from the Lyceum of Alabang, and pursuing her Philippine real estate license.

Post Miss Universe
On February 10, 2023, Cortesi made her acting debut in the finale episode of Philippine superhero television series, Darna, as Queen Kevnar of Marte.

Filmography

Television

References

External links 
 
 
 

1997 births
Living people
Filipino beauty pageant winners
Filipino female models
Filipino people of Italian descent
Miss Philippines Earth winners
Miss Earth 2018 contestants
Miss Universe 2022 contestants
Miss Universe Philippines winners
People from Pasay
People from Metro Manila
People from Rome
Bicolano people
People from Luzon